Toongabbie Anglican Church (TAC) is a medium-sized evangelical Anglican church in the Sydney Diocese of the Anglican Church of Australia. The church is located in the suburb of Pendle Hill in Sydney's west. Toongabbie Anglican Church is the sole church in the Anglican Parish of Toongabbie.

Activities

Sunday meetings
 Morning Services with kids programs (Sunday 8.45am & 10.45am)
 Traditional Church (Sunday 3pm)
 Sunday Night Church (Sunday 6pm)

Community
 ToonieKids Church (creche - Year 5) - part of Family Church
 ToonieKids@Play - a weekly play group
 One80 - youth group
 Growth groups (bible studies)
 Toongabbie Boomers

Current staff
 Mike Hastie, Lead Pastor
 Jon Flood, Associate Minister 
 Isaac Schumack,  Youth & Young Adults Minister
 Rachael Stabback,  Children's Minister
 Col Adamson, Christian Care Coordinator

History
The church is built on land that was granted to William Wentworth. There has been a church building of St Mary's Toongabbie since 1889. This first church was demolished in 1994.

The parish has contained up to four churches:
 St Mary's Anglican Church, Pendle Hill (the current site of TAC)
 St John's Anglican Church, Girraween (at 15-17 Tingurra Rd Girraween)
 St Mark's Anglican Church, Pendle Hill (located at 8 Pendle Way, Pendle Hill NSW)
 Holy Trinity Anglican Church, Toongabbie West (formerly in Cecilia Street, Toongabbie West)

List of rectors
 Mike Hastie 2022 - current
 Murray Colville 2021
 Raj Gupta 2007 - 2021
 Philip Bassett 1996 - 2007
 John Reid 1990-1996
 Martin Robinson

See also 

 Australian non-residential architectural styles
 List of Anglican churches in the Diocese of Sydney

External links
Official website
Satellite image from Google Maps

References

Anglican church buildings in Sydney
Anglican Church of Australia
Anglican Diocese of Sydney